Dina Kagramanov (born 24 August 1986), is an Azerbaijan-born Canadian chess player who holds the FIDE title of Woman International Master (WIM, 2009). She won Canadian Women's Chess Championship twice.

Biography
In 2003, Dina Kagramanov won the Canadian Girl's Chess Championship in the U18 age group. In 2005, she won Toronto Women's Chess Championship. In 2009, Dina Kagramanov for the first time won the Canadian Women's Chess Championship. In 2010 Kagramanov participated in Women's World Chess Championship by knock-out system and in the first round lost to Nana Dzagnidze.

She played for Canada in the Women's Chess Olympiads:
 In 2002, at second board in the 35th Chess Olympiad (women) in Bled (+6, =3, -3),
 In 2008, at third board in the 38th Chess Olympiad (women) in Dresden (+5, =1, -3),
 In 2010, at second board in the 39th Chess Olympiad (women) in Khanty-Mansiysk (+5, =1, -3).

In 2009, Kagramanov was awarded the FIDE Woman International Master (WIM) title.

References

External links
 
 
 
 Dina Kagramanov at Canadian Chess Biographies

1986 births
Living people
Sportspeople from Baku
Canadian female chess players
Chess Woman International Masters
Chess Olympiad competitors